AQ, Aq, aQ, or aq may refer to:

Businesses and organizations
 9 Air (IATA code AQ)
 AQ Interactive, Japanese video game developer
 Acquity Group stock symbol (NYSE: AQ)
 Alliance Quebec, a Canadian lobbyist group for English-speaking Quebecers
 Aloha Airlines, a defunct airline (former IATA code AQ)
 Al-Qaeda, a terrorist group
 Al-Qatala (The Killers), a video games Call of Duty: Modern Warfare (2019) and (2022)
 Automatic Qualifying conference, an NCAA athletic conference

Places
 .aq, the country code Top Level Domain for Antarctica
 Ak, Buin Zahra, also spelled Aq, a village in Iran
 American Samoa (DAFIF 0413 / DIA 65-18 / FIPS PUB 10-4)
 Antarctica (ISO 3166-1 country code)
 L'Aquila, a province of Italy

Science and technology
 .aq, the country code Top Level Domain for Antarctica
 Adaptive quantization, a quantization process that provides efficient compression
 Oracle Advanced Queuing, a message provider used in the software products of the Oracle Corporation
 Adversity quotient, in psychology, a score that measures the ability of a person to deal with adversities in his or her life
 8-Aminoquinoline, a heterocyclic bidentate ligand
 Anthraquinone, an aromatic organic compound
 Aq, a short form for inch of water, a unit of measurement of pressure
 Aqueous solution, dissolved in water
 Autism-spectrum quotient, a test for autism spectrum conditions in adults

Other uses
 A-Q (born 1986), stage name of Nigerian-born rapper Gilbert Bani
 Academic Quadrangle, a landmark building at Simon Fraser University
 AdventureQuest, a 2002 online role-playing game by Artix Entertainment
 Ah Q, or A Q, fictional character in novella The True Story of Ah Q
 Australian Quarterly, an Australian political science journal

See also
 Aqua (disambiguation)
 Ei-Q (1911–1960), photographer